, also known as Heroes Fantasia, is a role-playing video game developed by Witchcraft and published by Bandai Namco Games for the PlayStation Portable in 2012. It is a Japan-exclusive crossover game featuring characters from various 1990s and 2000s anime series, including Blood+, Darker than Black, Keroro, My-HiME, Orphen, Read or Die, Rune Soldier, s-CRY-ed, and Slayers Revolution.

References

External links 
 

2012 video games
Bandai Namco games
Crossover role-playing video games
Japan-exclusive video games
Japanese role-playing video games
PlayStation Portable games
PlayStation Portable-only games
Slayers video games
Video games based on anime and manga
Video games developed in Japan